The William Lindsey House is a historic house located at 373 North Main Street in Fall River, Massachusetts. It was designed by Rhode Island architect Russell Warren in 1844 for William Lindsey, a local merchant. It is one of seven extant monumental temple-fronted Greek Revival houses in Fall River, along with the John Mace Smith House next door.  It is a -story wood-frame structure, five bays wide, with a hip roof topped by an octagonal cupola.  The Greek temple front consists of a fully pedimented gable and entablature supported by four fluted Corinthian columns.

The house was added to the National Register of Historic Places in 1983. It is used for law offices.

See also
National Register of Historic Places listings in Fall River, Massachusetts
List of historic houses in Massachusetts

References

Houses in Fall River, Massachusetts
Russell Warren buildings
National Register of Historic Places in Fall River, Massachusetts
Houses on the National Register of Historic Places in Bristol County, Massachusetts
Greek Revival architecture in Massachusetts